Fabián Robles (born April 16, 1974 in León de los Aldama, Guanajuato, Mexico) is a Mexican actor. Robles began his career in 1994 to participate in the soap opera El vuelo del águila.

Family and personal
Fabián Robles’ father is actor Fernando Robles, and his brother is Julián Robles, who is an actor, writer and director. They appeared together in El vuelo del águila (1994).

Filmography

Films

Television

Awards and nominations

TVyNovelas Awards

References

External links 

1974 births
Living people
Mexican male telenovela actors
Mexican male film actors
Mexican male television actors
Male actors from Guanajuato
People from León, Guanajuato
20th-century Mexican male actors
21st-century Mexican male actors